Cool Springs is a historic home located near Camden, Kershaw County, South Carolina. It was built about 1832, and is a two-story Greek Revival style house on a raise brick basement. The original house was remodeled in the 1850s. It features a tiered portico and verandahs, supported by 64 Doric order columns. A two-story kitchen addition was attached to the house about 1935.  Also on the property are the contributing two horse stables, a concrete piscatory, an old stone spring, a brick basin, a dam, and granite gate posts.

It was listed on the National Register of Historic Places in 1989.

References

External links

Historic American Buildings Survey in South Carolina
Houses on the National Register of Historic Places in South Carolina
Greek Revival houses in South Carolina
Houses completed in 1832
Camden, South Carolina
Houses in Kershaw County, South Carolina
National Register of Historic Places in Kershaw County, South Carolina